Siege Equipment is a line of miniatures published by Rafm Miniatures beginning in 1982.

Contents
Siege Equipment is a line of 25mm miniatures from ordinary catapults and ballistas to obscure items like the crow and fire raiser.

Reception
Steve Jackson reviewed Siege Equipment in The Space Gamer No. 58. Jackson commented that "this is an attractive and authentic line. I recommend it without reservation to both fantasy and historical miniaturists. A siege is a siege, and here's what you need to win it."

25mm Siege Equipment was awarded the Origins Award for "Best Historical Figure Series of 1982".

References

See also
List of lines of miniatures

Miniature figures
Origins Award winners